The 1930 Auburn Tigers football team represented Auburn University in the 1930 college football season as a member of the Southern Conference (SoCon). Led by first-year head coach Chet A. Wynne, Auburn finished the season with a record of 3–7 overall and 1–6 in SoCon play, placing 21st.

Schedule

References

Auburn
Auburn Tigers football seasons
Auburn Tigers football